The 1936–37 Plunket Shield season was the sixteenth season where the Plunket Shield, the domestic first-class cricket competition of New Zealand, was competed as a league. Auckland won the championship.

Table

Results

Round 1

Round 2

Round 3

Statistics

Most Runs

Most Wickets

References

Plunket Shield
Plunket Shield